Grace Chapella (1874–1980) was a renowned Hopi-Tewa potter from a Tewa village and of the Bear Clan.

Early life
As a small child, Chapella learned pottery techniques from her mother, TaTung Pawbe and from her neighbor Nampeyo.  Her father, Toby Wehe, was a traditional farmer.

Art career
In the early 20th century, Chapella sold her pottery at the trading post established by Tom Polacca who was also a Tewa from First Mesa. Tom Polacca first encouraged her to sign her work.

Chapella was the subject of study by anthropologist Gene Weltfish. Her artwork is part of the permanent collection of the Brooklyn Museum.

Personal life 
In 1927, Chapella became the first Hopi to travel by airplane, when she flew to a pottery demonstration.

From 1917 to 1955, Chapella worked as the cook for the Polacca Day School.  In 1955 when Grace retired, the school personnel gave her a water spigot for her yard. At that time, plumbing was not common in Polacca, and Grace was the first person to have running water available at a private home.

Several of her descendants also became potters.

References 

Hopi-Tewa people
Native American potters
American women ceramists
American ceramists
Artists from Arizona
20th-century American women artists
Native American women artists
Women potters
American centenarians
1874 births
1980 deaths
Women centenarians
20th-century Native Americans
20th-century Native American women